The 2017–18 Divizia A was the 60th season of the Romanian men's handball second league. A total of 21 teams contested the league, being divided in two series, Seria A (10 teams) and Seria B (11 teams). At the end of the season the first place from both series promoted to Liga Națională, the 2nd and 3rd places from both series played a promotion play-off together with 11th and 12th place from Liga Națională.

Team changes

To Divizia A
Relegated from Liga Națională
 CSM Satu Mare
 Adrian Petrea Reșița

From Divizia A
Promoted to Liga Națională
 Politehnica Iași
 Minaur Baia Mare

Excluded teams
 CSM Satu Mare was dissolved at the end of the season.

 Avram Iancu Arad, Farul Constanța and LPS Piatra Neamț withdrew from the championship.

Enrolled teams
 ADEP Satu Mare and CS Medgidia enrolled in the Divizia A.

Renamed teams
 Adrian Petrea Reșița was refounded in the summer of 2017 as CSM Școlar Reșița and enrolled in the Divizia A.
 Academia Minaur Baia Mare was renamed as Minaur II Baia Mare.

Other teams
 CNOT Brașov was moved from Seria B to Seria A.

Teams

Seria A

Seria B

League tables

Seria A

Seria B

Promotion play-offs
The 11th and 12th-placed teams of the Liga Națională faced the 2nd and 3rd-placed teams of the Divizia A, from both Seria A and Seria B. The first place from each play-off group promoted to Liga Națională.

Serie I

Serie II

Third place
Because the winner of Divizia A, Seria B, CSM Oradea declined the participation in the 2018–19 Liga Națională, another play-off match was organised to establish the third place and implicitly the last team promoted. The match was played between the 2nd places from the two Relegation play-offs series.

Notes:
 HC Buzău qualified for 2018–19 Liga Națională and Atletico Alexandria qualified for 2018–19 Divizia A.

References

External links
 Romanian Handball Federaration 

Divizia A (men's handball)
2017 in Romanian sport
2018 in Romanian sport
2017–18 domestic handball leagues